Cribrarula gaskoini is a species of sea snail, a cowry, a marine gastropod mollusk in the family Cypraeidae, the cowries.

Description
The shell size varies between 10 mm and 30 mm

Distribution
This species is distributed along Hawaii and the Fiji Islands.

References

 Burgess, C.M. (1970). The Living Cowries. AS Barnes and Co, Ltd. Cranbury, New Jersey
 Schilder, M. and Schilder, F. A. 1971. A Catalogue of Living and Fossil Cowries. Taxonomy and Bibliography of Triviacea and Cypraeacea (Gastropoda Prosobranchia). Institut Royal des Sciences naturelles de Belgique, Mémoires, Deuxième Série, Fasc. 85: 246 pp. page(s): 56
 Lorenz & Hubert (2000). A guide to worldwide cowries. ConchBooks 1–584 page(s): 182
 Lorenz F. (2002) New worldwide cowries. Descriptions of new taxa and revisions of selected groups of living Cypraeidae (Mollusca: Gastropoda). Schriften zur Malakozoologie aus dem Haus der Natur-Cismar 20: 1–292, pls 1–40. page(s): 267

External links
 

Cypraeidae
Gastropods described in 1846